Landel is a surname. Notable people with the surname include:

Buddy Landel (1961–2015), American professional wrestler
Guy-Michel Landel (born 1990), Guinean footballer
Michel Landel (born 1951), French businessman
Robert F. Landel, American physical chemist

See also
Mandel